The Hebrew dictionary by Avraham Even-Shoshan, commonly known as the Even-Shoshan Dictionary, was first published (1948–1952) as " (milon ḥadash, A New Dictionary), later (1966–1970) as  (hamilon heḥadash, The New Dictionary), and finally (2003, well after his death) as  (milon even-shoshan, The Even-Shoshan Dictionary').

Contents
The Even-Shoshan Dictionary is written fully vowelized, and not just in ktiv maleh, because ktiv maleh may change the meaning slightly. For example, in the word "להניח" ('lehaniach'), if the ה ('heh') has a patach under it, it means "to cause rest;" while if it has a kamatz under it, it means "to place."

The dictionary contains over 70,000 words and includes etymological information, displaying roots and Aramaic, Akkadian, Arabic or Ugaritic cognates.
 Online editions 
An online edition is available with the application Babylon, and freely through the default Dictionary applications on Apple devices. Google also displays Even-Shoshan's dictionary entries when using the "define:''" operator: definition of the word עברית.

References

Hebrew dictionaries
1948 non-fiction books